William "Willdabeast" Adams (born September 6, 1988) is a professional dancer and choreographer who specializes in hip hop dance.

History
William "Willdabeast" Adams, who is originally from Indiana, began his more intense dance training in 2005 in cities like Indianapolis and Chicago. He then began to travel and attend many dance conventions like Monsters of Hip Hop, Pulse on Tour, and many others. A short three years later, Adams joined a local Indianapolis dance crew named "Destined 2 Be", and the crew went on to win the Indiana Black Expo two years in a row earning a perfect score at both appearances. Something like this had never been done in the history of the expo.

Professional experience
Just a short year later, Adams' crew gained national attention by making it through two rounds of America's Got Talent. This appearance led the crew to shows with groups like Breaksk8 and people like Jason Derulo. Adams' career slowly began to lift off from there as he began to book many more jobs and appeared in movies, commercials, short films, etc.

In late 2009, Adams chose to move to Los Angeles, California to continue to establish his career. In 2010, he landed a job dancing on tour for rap artist T-Pain. He also, since moving to LA, got jobs choreographing for Nike commercials and as a guest choreographer on one of the most popular dance television series in America, So You Think You Can Dance.

Recent expeditions
In 2013, Adams created the immaBEAST dance company. He auditioned hundreds of the most talented dancers in Los Angeles and across the country but only about 60 dancers made the final cut.

Adams' company immediately began producing videos and short films that have since gained millions of views and followers. The immaBEAST company has become one of the biggest hip hop brands in America and has also had a major influence on American dance culture as well 

Beginning in 2015, Adams incorporated the annual immaBeast audition into a workshop and training experience called the BuildaBeast Experience. The five day convention held in California every year consists of four days of workshops with some of the industry's top choreographers and the immaBeast audition on the fifth day. Each year, the convention's size keeps going from about 750 dancers the first year to over 1,000 dancers in over a year.

His most recent venture has been the company's dance studio called IMMA S p a c e. It went live on 28 February 2017 with a dance routine to That's what I like by Bruno Mars.  Choreographers like Brian Friedman, Tricia Miranda, Janelle Ginestra and Phil Wright schedule classes here.

References

External links
 Danceplug
 McDonald Selznick Associates
 Broadway Dance Center
 immaBeast

American male dancers
Living people
Artists from Los Angeles
American choreographers
Artists from Indianapolis
1988 births